Galaxie was a fortnightly entertainment magazine in Malaysia and published by Star Publications (M) Sdn. Bhd. The magazine was published from October 1974 to December 2013. It was also available in neighboring country, Singapore. 
The magazine stopped being printed after 39 years. The last issue was the 1-16 Dec (2013) issue which featured Elton John, Michael Jackson, Mariah Carey and Eminem, each of whom represent a decade of entertainment.

Awards and Recognitions 
Galaxie has been named Entertainment Magazine Of The Year by trade magazine Advertising + Marketing in 2011, 2012 and 2013.

References

External links
Official Website

1974 establishments in Malaysia
2013 disestablishments in Malaysia
Celebrity magazines
Defunct magazines published in Malaysia
Entertainment magazines
Biweekly magazines
Magazines published in Malaysia
Magazines established in 1974
Magazines disestablished in 2013
English-language magazines